Saldeh-e Sofla (also Romanized as Sāldeh-e Soflá; also known as Pā’īn Sāldeh) is a village in Natel-e Restaq Rural District, Chamestan District, Nur County, Mazandaran Province, Iran. As of the 2006 census, its population was 177, in 43 families.

References 

Populated places in Nur County